Robert Scott Lauder  (25 June 1803 – 21 April 1869) was a Scottish artist who described himself as a "historical painter". He was one of the original members of the Royal Scottish Academy.

Life and work
Lauder was born at Silvermills, Edinburgh, the third son of  Helen Tait (d.1850) and John Lauder of Silvermills (d. 1838), Burgess of Edinburgh and proprietor of the tannery at Silvermills. After attending the Royal High School he went to London, where his eldest brother William was engaged in the family business.

He returned to Edinburgh in about 1826 and was elected one of the original members of the Royal Scottish Academy in 1830. At this point Lauder was living with his brother William Lauder at 24 Fettes Row in Edinburgh's New Town. On 9 September 1833 at St Cuthbert's Church in Edinburgh he married Isabella Ramsay Thomson and they then went abroad, accompanied by his younger artist-brother, James Eckford Lauder. Robert studied for some years in Rome, Florence, Bologna, Venice and Munich.

Lauder returned to London in 1838 where he lived for several years, where his three children — Isabella, John, and Robert — were baptised at St. Thomas’s Church, Southwark, in 1840, 1841, and 1844 respectively.  Whilst in London he exhibited at the Royal Academy and competed in the Westminster Hall competition of 1847, sending his Christ walking on the Sea, which was subsequently purchased by Lady Angela Burdett-Coutts, 1st Baroness Burdett-Coutts. He became the first president of the short-lived National Institution of Fine Arts and also exhibited there.

He later removed back to Edinburgh in 1849 where both his sons — Robert Scott Lauder (born 1844), who became a physician, and John Thomson Lauder (1841–1865) — attended the Edinburgh Academy. Sir Walter Scott's novels provided him with subjects for many of his most successful historical paintings. About 1860 he suffered a paralytic stroke and did not practice after 1861. He died at Edinburgh from a bout of bronchitis on 21 April 1869, still paralysed.

He is buried in Warriston Cemetery in Edinburgh, beneath a large pale sandstone stone with white Sicilian marble inset, carved by John Hutchison. It stands to the east side of the westmost path, just south of Horatio McCulloch's grave, but is hard to spot as the sculpture and main monument faces away from the path into the undergrowth. His name is however listed at the head of the reverse side (facing the path) above that of his younger brother, James Eckford Lauder who is buried with him.

Selected paintings
Key works:

Scene from The Bride of Lammermoor (1839)
The Trial of Effie Deans (1840)
Meg Merrilies (1842)
Hannah presenting Samuel to Eli (1845)
Christ Teaches Humility (1845)
Mother and Child  (1848)
Sentinels
John Gibson Lockhart (Portrait)
Reverend John Thomson of Duddingstone (Portrait)
William Simson, R.S.A. (Portrait)
Hagar & Ishmael (1840)

Other pictures of note are:
Italian Goatherds entertaining a brother of the Santissima Trinita (1843)
Ruth "so she gleaned in the field until even" (1845) (see Book of Ruth)
The Gow Chrom Reluctantly Conducting the Glee Maiden to a Place of Safety (1846)
Christ and the Woman Taken in Adultery

Other portraits of note are:
Sir Archibald Alison, Bt.
Thomas Duncan
John Henning Sr.
Elizabeth Lauder, Mrs. William Paterson, with her daughter Janet
Henry Lauder (the artist's brother) painted .
Sir Thomas Dick Lauder
Robert Scott Lauder (self)
John Gibson Lockhart, with Charlotte Scott
David Roberts (1840)
David Scott
Sir John Steell
Thomas Thomson

Family

In 1833 he married Isabella Thomson (1809-1869) daughter of Rev John Thomson of Duddingston.

References

Notes
 Bryan's Dictionary of Painters and Engravers, edited by George C. Williamson, London 1927, (5 volumes).
 The Edinburgh Academy Register, Edinburgh, 1914.
 Testaments of John Lauder of Silvermills & Helen Tait, in the National Archives of Scotland.

External links

 Works in the National Galleries of Scotland

19th-century Scottish painters
Scottish male painters
Scottish portrait painters
Artists from Edinburgh
People educated at the Royal High School, Edinburgh
Alumni of the Edinburgh College of Art
1803 births
1869 deaths
Royal Scottish Academicians
Burials at Warriston Cemetery
19th-century Scottish male artists